The Long Haul (published originally as simply Long Haul) is a 1938 novel by A. I. Bezzerides that depicts the lives of truckers. Its central characters are Nick & Paul Benay, who transport fruit and other perishable goods between Northern and Southern California. It was adapted into the 1940 film They Drive by Night, starring George Raft and Humphrey Bogart. In the movie, the brothers name were changed to  Joe (George Raft) and Paul Fabrini (Humphrey Bogart). The book was also reprinted with the title They Drive by Night, published by Dell (book #416.)

1938 American novels
Novels set in California
American novels adapted into films